Mammelomys is a genus of rodent in the family Muridae endemic to New Guinea.
It contains the following species:

Genus Mammelomys
Large-scaled mosaic-tailed rat, Mammelomys lanosus
Large mosaic-tailed rat, Mammelomys rattoides

References

 
Rodent genera
Taxonomy articles created by Polbot